Franco De Menego (born 8 September 1944) is an Italian long-distance runner. He competed in the marathon at the 1972 Summer Olympics.

References

1944 births
Living people
Athletes (track and field) at the 1972 Summer Olympics
Italian male long-distance runners
Italian male marathon runners
Olympic athletes of Italy
Place of birth missing (living people)